Aigoual may refer to:
Mont Aigoual, the highest point of the Gard département, France
31192 Aigoual, asteroid